Cyperus serotinus is a species of sedge that is native to parts of Europe and Asia.

The species was first formally described by the botanist Christen Friis Rottbøll in 1773.

See also 
 List of Cyperus species

References 

serotinus
Taxa named by Christen Friis Rottbøll
Plants described in 1773
Flora of Afghanistan
Flora of Albania
Flora of Austria
Flora of Bangladesh
Flora of Assam (region)
Flora of Bulgaria
Flora of Cambodia
Flora of Russia
Flora of China
Flora of Corsica
Flora of France
Flora of Hungary
Flora of India
Flora of Iran
Flora of Mongolia
Flora of Italy
Flora of Japan
Flora of Kazakhstan
Flora of Korea
Flora of Pakistan
Flora of Portugal
Flora of Romania
Flora of Spain
Flora of Taiwan
Flora of Turkey
Flora of Turkmenistan
Flora of Uzbekistan
Flora of Vietnam